Bryan Alwyn Barlow (born 1933) is an Australian botanist. He was a member of Committee of the "Flora of Australia" 1982–1984, and 1986–1988. He is a former director of the Australian National Herbarium (1981-1988). He authored many Myrtaceae, Loranthaceae and Viscaceae species.

Some Publications

Books/book chapters 
 1986. Flora and fauna of alpine Australasia: ages and origins. Ed. Brill. 543 pp.
 1996. 'Viscaceae' in Flore de la Nouvelle-Caledonie. .

Articles
  1958. Heteroploid twins and apomixis in Casuarina nana Sieb. Australian Journal of Botany 6, 204–219. 
  1959.Cytological studies in the genus Casuarina. 206 pp. (Doctoral dissertation, University of Sydney_
  1966. A revision of the Loranthaceae of Australia and New Zealand. Australian Journal of Botany 14, 421–499. 
  1971. Cytogeography of the genus Eremophila. Australian Journal of Botany 19, 295–310. 
  &  1971. The Cytogeography of the Loranthaceous mistletoes. Taxon 20, 291–312. 
  &  1973. The classification of the generic segregates of Phrygilanthus (= Notanthera) of the Loranthaceae. Brittonia 25, 26. 
  1974. A revision of the Loranthaceae of New Guinea and the south-western Pacific. Australian Journal of Botany 22, 531–621.  
  1977. Host-parasite Resemblance in Australian Mistletoes: The Case for Cryptic Mimicry. Evolution 31, 69–84. 
  1981. The Australian Flora: its origin and evolution. In Flora of Australia Ed.  pp. 25–75. Canberra, AGPS.
  1983a. A revision of the genus Notothixos (Viscaceae). Brunonia 6, 1–24. 
  1983b. A revision of the Viscaceae of Australia. Brunonia 6, 25–57. 
  1990. Biogeographical relationships of Australia and Malesia: Loranthaceae as a model. In "The Plant Diversity of Malesia: Proceedings of the Flora Malesiana Symposium commemorating Professor Dr. C. G. G. J. van Steenis Leiden, August 1989." (Eds ,  & ) pp. 273–292. 
  1994. Phytogeography of the Australian region. In "Australian Vegetation", CUP, Cambridge. Ed , pp. 3–35.
  1997. Viscaceae. Flora Malesiana 403-442.
  1997. Loranthaceae  Flora Malesiana 209-401

See also
 :Category:Taxa named by Bryan Alwyn Barlow

References

External links
Link to query giving taxa (and wikipedia pages of taxa) authored by Bryan Alwyn Barlow

20th-century Australian botanists
Living people
1933 births
University of Sydney alumni
Academic staff of Flinders University